Jefferson Andrés Viveros Mina (born 21 December 1988) is a Colombian professional footballer who plays as a forward.

References

External links
 
 

1988 births
Living people
Colombian footballers
Association football forwards
Atlético F.C. footballers
San Francisco F.C. players
Barranquilla F.C. footballers
Club Deportivo Palestino footballers
San Antonio Unido footballers
C.D. FAS footballers
Fortaleza C.E.I.F. footballers
Uniautónoma F.C. footballers
C.D. Juventud Independiente players
Comerciantes Unidos footballers
C.D. Dragón footballers
A.D. Isidro Metapán footballers
Los Caimanes footballers
C.D. Real Sociedad players
Chilean Primera División players
Colombian expatriate footballers
Colombian expatriate sportspeople in Panama
Expatriate footballers in Panama
Colombian expatriate sportspeople in Chile
Expatriate footballers in Chile
Colombian expatriate sportspeople in El Salvador
Expatriate footballers in El Salvador
Colombian expatriate sportspeople in Guatemala
Expatriate footballers in Guatemala
Colombian expatriate sportspeople in Peru
Expatriate footballers in Peru
Colombian expatriate sportspeople in Honduras
Expatriate footballers in Honduras
Sportspeople from Valle del Cauca Department